Reginald Keith "Reggie" Barnes (born October 23, 1969) is a former American football linebacker in the National Football League for the Pittsburgh Steelers and Dallas Cowboys. He played college football at the University of Oklahoma.

Early years
Barnes attended South Grand Prairie High School. He accepted a football scholarship from the University of Oklahoma. As a freshman, he was a reserve linebacker and tallied 33 tackles. As a sophomore, he was switched from outside linebacker to defensive end, registering 43 tackles.

As a junior, he became a full-time starter at defensive end, recording 73 tackles and 9 sacks. As a senior, he started in 9 games, posting 46 tackles and 7 sacks.

Professional career
Barnes was signed as an undrafted free agent by the Pittsburgh Steelers after the 1993 NFL Draft. As a rookie, he was a reserve outside linebacker and finished second on the team with 13 special teams tackles. He also had 12 defensive tackles, one quarterback pressure and 2 passes defensed. He had 4 tackles in the eighth game against the Cleveland Browns after replacing an injured Jerry Olsavsky. He filled in at middle linebacker in place of an injured Greg Lloyd during the fifteenth game against the Seattle Seahawks and in the playoffs. He was waived on August 28, 1994.

On February 13, 1995, he signed as a free agent with the Dallas Cowboys. He was a reserve player, registering 4 defensive tackles and 7 special teams tackles. He appeared in 7 games and was released on October 19, 1995. The team would go on to win Super Bowl XXX.

On January 3, 1996, he was signed as a free agent by the Green Bay Packers. He was released on July 15, 1996.

References

Sportspeople from Arlington, Texas
Players of American football from Texas
American football linebackers
Pittsburgh Steelers players
Dallas Cowboys players
Oklahoma Sooners football players
University of Oklahoma alumni
1969 births
Living people